Cornwallis Square is a Canadian village in Kings County, Nova Scotia. It is located on the Cornwallis River.

History 
The village commission was originally established in 1947 as the WCG Commission and was responsible for fire protection, recreation and sidewalks in Waterville, Cambridge, and Grafton. When the rural community of Woodville was included in the service area in the 1960s the name was changed to Cornwallis Square.

The area's largest employer is Michelin.

Climate

References

 Kings County Register, May 2007

Communities in Kings County, Nova Scotia
Villages in Nova Scotia
General Service Areas in Nova Scotia